My-Van Tran  is a Vietnamese-Australian author and academic. Tran was born in South Vietnam, and she and her family were forced to leave the country when the North Vietnamese Army defeated the Army of the Republic of Vietnam (ARVN), during the Fall of Saigon.

She emigrated to Australia and received her PhD from the Australian National University, having previously studied for her MA at Duke University. She has taught at the University of South Australia.

She has authored several books concerning Vietnamese history, A Vietnamese Royal Exile in Japan: Prince Cuong De (1882–1951), A Vietnamese Scholar in Anguish, The Long Journey, Australia's First Boat People and A report on the settlement of Indo-Chinese refugees in Darwin, the Northern Territory.

In the 1986 Australia Day Honours Tran was awarded the Medal of the Order of Australia for "service to Asian-Australian relations" and in 2002 she was appointed a Member of the Order of Australia for "service to the Vietnamese community, and to the promotion of multiculturalism and Asian studies".

External links 

 Ripples of Wartime Project - Interview with My-Van Tran

References

Year of birth missing (living people)
Living people
Academics of Vietnamese descent
Vietnamese emigrants to Australia
Academic staff of the University of South Australia
Writers of Vietnamese descent
Recipients of the Medal of the Order of Australia
Members of the Order of Australia
Australian National University alumni
Duke University alumni